The men's 200 metres event at the 2009 Asian Athletics Championships was held at the Guangdong Olympic Stadium on November 12–13.

Medalists

Results

Heats
Wind: Heat 1: +1.9 m/s, Heat 2: +0.9 m/s, Heat 3: +0.9 m/s, Heat 4: +0.9 m/s

Semifinals
Wind: Heat 1: -0.1 m/s, Heat 2: +1.0 m/s

Final
Wind: +0.6 m/s

References
Results

2009 Asian Athletics Championships
200 metres at the Asian Athletics Championships